The Men's 1500 metres at the 2011 World Championships in Athletics was held at the Daegu Stadium on August 30 and September 1 & 3.

In the heats, Mehdi Baala, who has a history of this sort of incident, fell flat on his face as the final sprint began.  He was eventually advanced by the referees to the semi-finals, where he qualified for the final.

The first semi-final went out slowly and was a strategic race with a bunch finish.  Defending champion Yusuf Saad Kamel finished 6th in that semi and failed to make the time qualifier.  The second semi went out on a decidedly faster pace bringing the time qualifiers along with the automatic qualifiers.  Previous silver medalist Deresse Mekonnen was left behind in the final kick.  With Bernard Lagat opting to run the 5,000 metres, no returning medalists made the final, though all current Olympic medalists did make the final.

The final went out at 4 minute mile pace, with Nick Willis leading Matthew Centrowitz and the pack through a 60-second 400, slowing to almost 2:02 by 800.  Shortly after that, the Kenyans Asbel Kiprop and Silas Kiplagat moved to the front, chased by Mekonnen Gebremedhin and much of the pack swallowed the early leaders.  Centrowitz stepped to the side and followed.  As the pack tried to jockey for position, Kiprop refused to relinquish the lead along the rail, even as teammate Kiplagat took the lead on the outside during the backstretch. Kiprop and then Kiplagat continued that way to the finish.  Abdalaati Iguider stayed a step behind Kiprop and was in third coming down the home stretch.  As he faded, Centrowitz, who had come around the outside followed by Manuel Olmedo moved back up to finish third.

Medalists

Records

Qualification standards

Schedule

Results

Heats
Qualification: First 6 in each heat (Q) and the next 6 fastest (q) advance to the semifinals.

Semifinals
Qualification: First 5 in each heat (Q) and the next 2 fastest (q) advance to the final.

Final

References

External links
1500 metres results at IAAF website

1500
1500 metres at the World Athletics Championships